Théry Schir (born 18 February 1993) is a Swiss professional racing cyclist, who most recently rode for UCI Continental team . He rode at the 2015 UCI Track Cycling World Championships.

Major results

Track

2011
 UEC European Junior Track Championships
1st  Madison (with Stefan Küng)
2nd  Points race
2012
 UEC European Under-23 Track Championships
2nd  Scratch
2nd  Team pursuit
2013
 UEC European Under-23 Track Championships
1st  Team pursuit
2nd  Madison (with Stefan Küng)
2nd  Points race
2014
 1st  Team pursuit, UEC European Under-23 Track Championships
 2013–14 UCI Track Cycling World Cup, Guadalajara
2nd  Team pursuit
3rd  Madison (with Stefan Küng)
 3rd  Madison, UCI Track Cycling World Championships (with Stefan Küng)
 3rd  Team pursuit, 2014–15 UCI Track Cycling World Cup, Guadalajara
2015
 UEC European Under-23 Track Championships
1st  Madison (with Frank Pasche)
1st  Omnium
2nd  Team pursuit
 2015–16 UCI Track Cycling World Cup
2nd  Team pursuit, Cali
2nd  Madison, Cambridge (with Silvan Dillier)
3rd  Madison, Cali (with Stefan Küng)
 2nd  Team pursuit, UEC European Track Championships
2018
 2nd  Team pursuit, UEC European Track Championships
2019
 2nd  Scratch, 2018–19 UCI Track Cycling World Cup, Cambridge
 European Games
2nd  Omnium
3rd  Team pursuit
 2019–20 UCI Track Cycling World Cup, Hong Kong
3rd  Omnium
3rd  Team pursuit

Road

2011
 2nd Time trial, National Junior Road Championships
2013
 2nd Time trial, National Under-23 Road Championships
2014
 1st  Time trial, National Under-23 Road Championships
2015
 1st  Time trial, National Under-23 Road Championships
 8th Time trial, UCI Under-23 Road World Championships
 8th Paris–Roubaix Espoirs
2016
 3rd Time trial, National Road Championships
2017
 3rd Time trial, National Road Championships
2018
 3rd Overall Tour of Mevlana
 6th Overall Tour of Black Sea
2021
 3rd Time trial, National Road Championships

References

External links
 
 

1993 births
Living people
Swiss male cyclists
Sportspeople from Lausanne
Olympic cyclists of Switzerland
Cyclists at the 2016 Summer Olympics
Cyclists at the 2020 Summer Olympics
Swiss track cyclists
Cyclists at the 2019 European Games
European Games medalists in cycling
European Games bronze medalists for Switzerland
European Games silver medalists for Switzerland